Antaeotricha biarcuata is a moth of the family Depressariidae. It is found in Colombia, Venezuela, Panama and Trinidad.

The wingspan is 18-20 mm. The forewings are white, partially with a slight ochreous tinge and with a patch of dark purple-fuscous mottling on the basal fourth of the dorsum, just reaching the costa at the base, with the projecting scales of the dorsum coppery-fulvous. There is an interrupted dentate grey line from one-fourth of the costa to the middle of the dorsum, furcate towards the dorsum. The second discal stigma is blackish and there is a grey shade from the costa beyond the middle to before this, then angled upwards over it and again beyond, and running to the tornus. A subquadrate blotch of dark fuscous mottling is found on the dorsum before the tornus and there is some grey suffusion along the upper part of the termen. The hindwings are ochreous-whitish with the costa somewhat dilated anteriorly, with a broad projection of dark grey white-tipped hairscales before the middle, and a whitish-ochreous subcostal hairpencil from the base to beyond the middle.

References

Moths described in 1926
biarcuata
Taxa named by Edward Meyrick
Moths of South America